During its history, Alfa Romeo has competed successfully in many different categories of motorsport, including Grand Prix motor racing, Formula One, sportscar racing, touring car racing and rallies. They have competed both as a constructor and an engine supplier, via works entries (usually under the name Alfa Corse or Autodelta) and private entries. The first racing car was made in 1913, three years after the foundation of A.L.F.A., the 40/60 HP had 6-litre straight-4 engine. Alfa Romeo quickly gained a good name in motorsport and gave a sporty image to the whole marque.

Pre-war

Early history

Alfa Romeo started motor racing almost immediately after it was founded. A.L.F.A. ventured into motor racing in 1911, with drivers Franchini and Ronzoni competing in the Targa Florio with two 24 HP models. The marque's first success came in 1913 when Nino Franchini finished second in the Parma-Poggio Berceto race with a 40/60 HP. Giuseppe Merosi built a very advanced racing car in 1914, which was named "Grand Prix". In 1920, Giuseppe Campari won the race at Mugello with a 40/60 HP, whilst Enzo Ferrari was second in Targa Florio in the same year. A year later, Giuseppe Campari won at Mugello again. Ugo Sivocci won the 1923 Targa Florio and Antonio Ascari took second, both with an RL. Sivocci's car was painted with the green cloverleaf on a white background that was to become Alfa's symbol on their sportiest models.

Grand Prix racing

In 1923, the automobile designer Vittorio Jano went from FIAT to Alfa, designing the engines that gave Alfa racing success into the late 1930s. In 1925, Alfa Romeo triumphed at the first Automobile World Championship in the history of motorsport, winning the European Grand Prix at Spa and the Italian Grand Prix at Monza.

In 1932, Jano designed the sensational P3 which won its first race driven by Tazio Nuvolari at the Italian Grand Prix, as well as 5 more Grands Prix that year between Nuvolari and Rudolf Caracciola. In 1933, Alfa Romeo became insolvent and was transferred to Enzo Ferrari's team Scuderia Ferrari, but the P3 continue to win a variety of races that year, including the Italian and Spanish Grand Prix.

In 1934, Louis Chiron won the French Grand Prix, but the P3 started to lose its edge while the German Silver Arrows began to dominate. However, the P3 still managed to rack up some Grand Prix wins. 1935 was even tougher as the P3 was simply outclassed by the Silver Arrows, but Tazio Nuvolari gave it one of its most memorable victories by winning the 1935 German Grand Prix at the Nürburgring.

Sportscar racing
Notably, Tazio Nuvolari won the 1930 Mille Miglia in a 6C 1750 after having overtaken Achille Varzi with the headlights off at nighttime. Alfa Romeo's cars won the Targa Florio six times in row in the 1930s and the Mille Miglia every year from 1928 to 1938 except for 1931.

The 8C 2300 won the Le Mans 24 Hours from 1931 to 1934. In 1938, Clemente Biondetti won the Mille Miglia in an 8C 2900B Corto Spider; notably, Biondetti will win the first edition of Mille Miglia post-war (1947) with another 8C 2900B.

Post-war

Formula One

During the 1960s, minor teams such as LDS, Cooper, and De Tomaso used the Alfa Romeo straight-four engines. In the early 1970s, a V8 Alfa Romeo appeared in McLaren and March cars.

Alfa Romeo also supplied engines to the small Italian Osella team from 1983 to 1987. For the 1987 season, Alfa Romeo made a deal to supply engines to Ligier, but both deals were cancelled when Fiat took control of Alfa Romeo.

In November 2017, Sauber signed a multi-year technical and commercial partnership contract with Alfa Romeo, therefore renaming to Alfa Romeo Sauber F1 Team for the  season onwards. On 1 February 2019, Sauber announced that it would compete in the 2019 season as Alfa Romeo Racing, although the ownership, racing licence, and management structure would remain unchanged.

Formula Three

Alfa Romeo has also supplied engines to Formula Three cars.

In Europe, Alfa Romeo won five FIA European Formula 3 Championship and five FIA European Formula 3 Cup as well as a plethora of national championships in Italy (11), France (7), Germany (2), Switzerland (5), Sweden, and Austria (2). Among these, the 1979 Piercarlo Ghinzani victory at the Italian Formula Three Championship driving a Euroracing March 793 with a 2 litre Alfa engine, the four consecutive Italian titles between 1981 and 1984, and Michele Alboreto's 1980 victory at the FIA European Formula 3 Championship with a March-Alfa Romeo. Noteworthy was the adoption of the Twin Spark engine 1987 which fostered this success.

In South America, Alfa Romeo won 4 Formula 3 Sudamericana titles, 7 Mexican Championships, 1 Brazilian Championship, and 3 Chilean Championship.

From 2019 to 2020, a Tatuus T-318 powered by an Autotecnica Motori tuned Alfa Romeo 1.75 L 4-cyl turbocharged engine producing  was used in the Formula Regional European Championship, the Formula Regional Asian Championship, and the W Series.

Formula Alfa Boxer
After the great success of the one-make championship Trofeo Alfasud, in 1987 Alfa Romeo launched the new Formula Alfa Boxer racing car which had an engine derived from the 33 and the Sprint. Amato Ferrari won the debut championship in 1987, followed by Mirko Savoldi in 1988 and Alessandro Zampedri in 1989.

In 1990, this engine was replaced by a more powerful Quadrifoglio Verde engine. In 1992, a European Championship (Formula Boxer Europe) was launched and the choice of chassis was liberalised. The last Formula Alfa Boxer series season was held in 1995.

Indycars

From 1989 to 1991, Alfa Romeo participated in the PPG Indy Car World Series. The 2648 cc, turbocharged V8 engine produced 720 bhp. In the 1989 season, the engine was mated to a chassis specially built by March and prepared by Alex Morales Motorsports, with Roberto Guerrero at the wheel. Guerrero only managed a best of 8th place at Detroit, before both driver and engine moved onto Patrick Racing for 1990, again with a March chassis. That season proved to be an improvement, as Guerrero finished 16th place in the points standings, with a best finish of 5th place. The next year would be Alfa's last. The team switched to a Lola chassis, and Danny Sullivan took over the drive, finishing 11th in the points, with a best finish of 4th.  In the end, Alfa Romeo would finish its Indy Car project without scoring a single podium, pole position, or race win.

Rally

Alfa Romeo cars have also been used in rallying, mostly by private teams.

In the 1950s, Alfa Romeo Giulietta won the 1957 Tour de Corse and the 1958 1000 Lakes Rally, as well as the Alpine Rally in 1956 and 1958. The victories in Alpine Rally were replicated in 1963 (Alfa Romeo Giulietta SZ), 1964 (Alfa Romeo Giulia TZ), 1966 (Alfa Romeo GTA) under the management of the racing department Autodelta, making Alfa Romeo the most successful car maker in this competition.

Racing versions of the Alfetta GT and GTV were built by Autodelta in the 1970s, initially with an aspirated engine from the earlier GTA, for homologation under FIA Group 2. In this form, they were rallied with moderate success in 1975, winning the Elba and Costa Brava rallies overall, as well as winning the Group 2 category in the Tour de Corse. In 1980, the Alfetta GTV Turbodelta was already homologated in FIA Group 4, since the required number
of production cars had been built. A racing version campaigned in rallies, but once more the effort was abandoned after a single season, despite scoring a win at the Danube Rally.

In 1986, Alfa Romeo GTV6 was one of the fastest Group A rally cars. However, FIA reclassified it as a Group B car at the end of 1986, changing it from a winning car to a car that was much less competitive. The GTV6 placed 3rd in 1986 Tour de Corse. In 1987, with Greg Carrbehind the wheel, the GTV6 was the last rear-wheel drive car to win the Australian Rally Championship.

Sportscars

On March 6, 1963, Alfa Romeo's racing department Autodelta was established to run Alfa Romeo's sportscar programme, directed by ex-Alfa Romeo and Ferrari engineer Carlo Chiti. Competing with the Alfa Romeo TZ, the team began to collect some remarkable wins in its 1.6 category, including in the 1964 Coppa F.I.S.A., the 1964 12 Hours of Sebring, the 48th Targa Florio, the 1964 Nürburgring 1000 km, and the 1964 24 Hours of Le Mans.

In 1967, Carlo Chiti and the Audodelta team designed a new 90-degree V8 engine for their Alfa Romeo Tipo 33 sportscar and ultimately a flat-12 engine for the Alfa Romeo 33TT12. These cars were raced in the World Sportscar Championship from 1967 to 1977, winning the World Championship for Makes in 1975 with the 33TT12 and the World Championship for Sports Cars in 1977 with the Alfa Romeo 33SC12. The company developed a Group C prototype in the early 1990s, codenamed the SE 048SP, but this never raced.

Touring cars
Starting from the 1960s, Alfa Romeo has won many touring car titles. The Alfa Romeo GTA won the European Touring Car Championship (ETCC) in 1966, 1967 and 1969. The later Alfa Romeo GTAm won further ETCC titles in 1970, 1971 and 1972. Among other victories, the GTA won the inaugural Sports Car Club of America's Under 2 Liter Trans-Am championship in 1966 with Horst Kwech and Gaston Andrey at the wheel. repeating the feat in the 1970 season. The Alfa Romeo Alfetta GTV6 won four consecutive European Touring Car Championship titles between 1982 and 1985. The British Touring Car Championship was won in 1983 by Andy Rouse driving an Alfetta GTV6 and again in 1994 by Gabriele Tarquini with an Alfa Romeo 155.

In 1993, the Deutsche Tourenwagen Meisterschaft (DTM) series was won by Nicola Larini with an Alfa Romeo 155 V6 Ti, also achieving the all-time record wins of championship races in a season (11). The successor of the 155, the Alfa Romeo 156 won the European Touring Car Championship four times in a row from 2000 to 2003, with Fabrizio Giovanardi and Gabriele Tarquini.

From 2007 to 2009, Alfa Romeo's cars (159 and 147) won in Eco Diesel categories (Class G and H) of the Bathurst 12 Hour race on three consecutive occasions.

In recent years, several different drivers and teams have competed with the Alfa Romeo Giulietta in various TCR Touring Car series worldwide:

 Matteo Leone, Andrea Bacci, Andrea Mosca and Gianni Giudici in the 2016 Italian Touring Car Championship.
 Fabio Marchiafava, Loris Cencetti and Philippe Ménage (competing with the Charleroi on Tracks team) in the 2016 TCR BeNeLux Touring Car Championship.
 Mario Ferraris, Petr Fulín, Andrea Belicchi and Michela Cerruti (competing with the Mulsanne Racing team) in the 2016 TCR International Series.
 Márk Jedlóczky (competing with the Unicorse Team) and Shota Abkhazava, Davit Kajaia, Dušan Borković and Michela Cerruti (competing with the GE-Force team) in the 2017 TCR International Series.
 Giacomo Altoè, Joakim Darbom, Tomasso Mosca and Luigi Ferrara (competing with the V-Action Racing team) and Andrea Bacci and Andrea Mosca (competing with the Etruria team) in the 2017 TCR Italy Touring Car Championship.
 Gianni Morbidelli, Luigi Ferrara, Kevin Ceccon and Fabrizio Giovanardi (competing with the Team Mulsanne) in the 2018 World Touring Car Cup.
 Rob Austin (competing with the DUO Motorsport with HMS Racing team) in the 2018 British Touring Car Championship.
 Adriano Bernazzani and Edoardo Cappello (competing with the Otto Motorsport team) and Kevin Ceccon (competing with the Team Mulsanne) in the 2018 TCR Italy Touring Car Championship.
 Alex Popow, Alex Papadopulos, Mark Kvamme, Trenton Estep and Ryan Nash (competing with the TMR Engineering and Consulting Inc. team) and Roy Block and Tim Lewis Jr. (competing with the KMW Motorsports with TMR Engineering team) in the 2019 Michelin Pilot Challenge.
Roy Block and Tim Lewis Jr. (competing with the KMW Motorsports with TMR Engineering team) in the IMSA Michelin Pilot Challenge from 2019 to 2023.

In addition, Tecnodom Sport used the Alfa Romeo MiTo in the 2016 season of the Italian Touring Car Championship.

Major victories and championships
Alfa Romeo has won the following major trophies and championships:

Notes

References

External links
  

 
Grand Prix teams
World Sportscar Championship teams
24 Hours of Le Mans teams
Auto racing teams established in 1913